Congregation of the Sisters of Merciful Jesus is a Catholic female religious order.

The order was founded just after the Second World War by Michał Sopoćko according to the reported apparitions of Faustina Kowalska in Myślibórz with the goal to promote the Divine Mercy message. It has houses in a dozen of countries, with the General in Gorzów Wielkopolski.

Bibliography
The Sisters of Merciful Jesus
Divine Mercy in Action
University of Glasgow

religious orders
Divine Mercy